was a lawyer, politician and cabinet minister in the early Shōwa period of Japan. His brother, Tatsunosuke Yamazaki was also a politician and cabinet minister, and his nephew Heihachiro Yamazaki was later a prominent member of the post-war Liberal-Democratic Party.

Biography
Yamazaki was born in Ōkawa, Fukuoka. After his graduation in 1918 from the law school of Tokyo Imperial University, he entered the Home Ministry. He subsequently transferred to the Ministry of Health, rising to the post of Director of Social Services. In 1938, he was appointed governor of Shizuoka Prefecture. He subsequently returned to the Home Ministry, and was Director of Public Works, followed by Director of Public Safety. In 1940, succeeded Genki Abe as Superintendent-General of the Tokyo Metropolitan Police, the highest-ranking office in the police administration. From 1942-1943, he served as Deputy Home Minister under the Tōjō administration, and also from 1944-1945 under the  Suzuki Kantarō administration. In mid-1944, he was assigned as civilian administrator of Japanese-occupied Borneo, where he encouraged a policy of Japanization of the local inhabitants through education to bolster support for Imperial Japan’s war efforts.

Following the surrender of Japan, Yamazaki was appointed Home Minister under the Higashikuni administration. During his tenure, he attempted to ban publication of a photograph Emperor Hirohito taken together with General Douglas MacArthur, on the grounds that this was demeaning to the imperial dignity. This action drew the wrath of the occupation authorities, who were attempting to portray Hirohito in more “human” terms.

He also strongly opposed the decision by the occupation authorities to release political prisoners held under the Peace Preservation Laws, stating in an interview with the Japan Times newspaper on 4 October 1945 that anyone advocating any changes in the present political structure, of the status of the Emperor was a communist who should be arrested.

He resigned together with the rest of the cabinet in protest of the repeal of the Peace Preservation Laws on 9 October 1945 and was immediately placed on the purged list of those banned from holding government office.

Following the end of the occupation, Yamazaki was elected to a seat lower house of the Diet of Japan in the 1952 General Election under the Liberal Party. During the debate over the adoption of the post-war Constitution of Japan, he publicly speculated that it might be better for Japan to become a protectorate of the United States.

Yamazaki was associated with the politically conservative wing of the party after it became the Liberal Democratic Party and was a leading member of the faction led by Mitsujiro Ishii. He served as chairman of the budgetary committee in 1957. In 1960, he was appointed to the cabinet of Prime Minister Hayato Ikeda as Minister of Home Affairs. Yamazaki also served as Chairman of the National Public Safety Commission. He was forced to resign in the aftermath of the assassination of Inejiro Asanuma, president of the Japan Socialist Party during a televised speech.

Yamazaki retired thereafter from public life, and died in 1968 at the age of 73.

References

Dore, R.P.  Japan, Internationalism and the UN. Routledge. 
Hunter, Janet.  A Concise Dictionary of Modern Japanese History . University of California Press (1994). 
Large, Stephen. Emperor Hirohito and Showa Japan: A Political Biography. Routledge (1992). 
Nishi, Toshio. Unconditional Democracy: Education and Politics in Occupied Japan, 1945-1952. Hoover Press (2004).

External links

Notes

1894 births
1963 deaths
Politicians from Fukuoka Prefecture
University of Tokyo alumni
Government ministers of Japan
Ministers of Home Affairs of Japan
Liberal Party (Japan, 1945) politicians
Liberal Democratic Party (Japan) politicians
Governors of Shizuoka Prefecture